DMAX (formerly called Discovery MAX) is a Spanish free-to-air television channel run by Warner Bros. Discovery and Unidad Editorial.

Programs 
DMAX shows survival, kitchen, motor, wild world and crime investigation programmes, and similar, addressing mainly a young male audience.
 How It's Made
 LA Ink
 Cake Boss 
 Hell's Kitchen
 Deadliest Catch
 Top Gear USA
 Ultimate Survival 
 American Chopper
 Destroyed In Seconds
 Border Security: Australia's Front Line 
 Stan Lee's Superhumans 
 Top Chef
 Dirty Jobs
 Into the Universe with Stephen Hawking 
 Overhaulin'
 MythBusters
 Dual Survival
 River Monsters
 Wheeler Dealers
 99 lugares donde pasar miedo
 Alaskan Bush People

Other DMAX channels
DMAX (UK TV channel)
DMAX (South East Asian TV channel)
DMAX (Italy)

References

External links
 

Television stations in Spain
Television channels and stations established in 2012
Spanish-language television stations
Spain
Men's interest channels
Warner Bros. Discovery EMEA